Ramscraig  is a small scattered crofting hamlet, located 2 miles southwest from Dunbeath, in eastern Caithness, Scottish Highlands and is in the Scottish council area of Highland.

References

Populated places in Caithness